For Jennifer is a 32-foot-tall sculpture by Joel Shapiro, installed in Denver, Colorado, U.S.

References

Outdoor sculptures in Denver